The 2003 Cork Intermediate Hurling Championship was the 94th staging of the Cork Intermediate Hurling Championship since its establishment by the Cork County Board in 1909. The draw for the opening fixtures took place on 8 December 2002. The championship began on 27 April 2003 and ended on 26 October 2003.

On 26 October 2003, Bride Rovers won the championship after a 1–15 to 1–05 defeat of Inniscarra in the final at Páirc Uí Chaoimh. It remains their only championship title in the grade.

Youghal's Eoin Coleman was the championship's top scorer with 0-31.

Team changes

To Championship

Promoted from the Cork Junior A Hurling Championship
 Ballinhassig

Regraded from the Cork Senior Hurling Championship
 Ballincollig

From Championship

Promoted to the Cork Senior Hurling Championship
 Delanys

Results

Preliminary round

First round

Second round

Third round

 Aghabullogue received a bye in this round.

Fourth round

Quarter-finals

Semi-finals

Final

Championship statistics

Top scorers

Overall

In a single game

References

Cork Intermediate Hurling Championship
Cork Intermediate Hurling Championship